We'll Take Manhattan is a 1990 American TV film directed by Andy Cadiff, with Jackée Harry, Corinne Bohrer, Edan Gross, Joel Brooks.

References

1990 television films
1990 films
American television films